Olga L. Mayol-Bracero is a Puerto Rican atmospheric chemist. Mayol-Bracero is an associate professor at the UPRRP College of Natural Sciences. Her primary research focus is atmospheric aerosols. She researches the impact of atmospheric aerosols on the climate, ecosystem, degradation of structures, and human health.

Education 
Mayol-Bracero completed a B.Sc. (1989) and M.Sc. (1994) in chemistry at University of Puerto Rico, Río Piedras Campus (UPRRP). Her master's thesis was titled Evaluation of a Continuous  Composite Sampler for Volatile Organic Compounds in Water. She earned a Ph.D. in chemistry at UPRRP and Lawrence Berkeley National Laboratory in 1998. Her dissertation was titled Chemical and physical characterization of submicron organic aerosols in the tropical trade winds in the Caribbean. She was a postdoctoral fellow at Max Planck Institute for Chemistry from 1998 to 2001.

References

External links 

 

Living people
Year of birth missing (living people)
Place of birth missing (living people)
University of Puerto Rico faculty
University of Puerto Rico, Río Piedras Campus alumni
Puerto Rican women scientists
American women chemists
21st-century American chemists
21st-century American women scientists
Puerto Rican scientists
American atmospheric scientists
Women atmospheric scientists
Atmospheric chemists
American women academics